Noel Treacy (18 December 1951 – 2 February 2022) was an Irish Fianna Fáil politician who served as a Teachta Dála (TD) for the Galway East constituency from 1982 to 2011. He served as Minister of State in a number of departments over his career.

Early life
Treacy was born in Ballinasloe, County Galway, in 1951. He was educated at Gurteen National School and St. Joseph's College, Garbally Park in Ballinasloe. He worked as an auctioneer and financial services manager before entering public life. He was married to Mary Cloonan and had three daughters and one son.

Political career
Treacy joined Fianna Fáil at 17 in 1969. Treacy was first elected to Dáil Éireann at a by-election in July 1982 caused by the death of Fianna Fáil TD Johnny Callanan and was re-elected at each election until his retirement in 2011. His election marked the last time a government party was successful in winning a by-election until the election of Patrick Nulty of the Labour Party in the Dublin West by-election in 2011. He was a member of Galway County Council from 1985 to 1991.

In March 1987, Fianna Fáil returned to government under Charles Haughey, and Treacy was appointed as Minister of State at the Department of Finance, with special responsibility for the Office of Public Works and the Central Development Committee. The following year he was appointed to an additional role as Minister of State at the Department of the Taoiseach, with responsibility for Heritage, the first minister assigned with this responsibility.

After the 1989 general election, Fianna Fáil formed a coalition government with the Progressive Democrats. Treacy was appointed as Minister of State at the Department of Health with responsibility for Children. In February 1991, he was reassigned as Minister of State at the Department of Justice with responsibility for Law Reform. He was sacked by Haughey in November 1991.

In February 1992, Albert Reynolds succeeded Haughey as Taoiseach, and Treacy was appointed again as Minister of State at the Department of Finance]], with special responsibility for the Office of Public Works and the Central Development Committee. In January 1993, Fianna Fáil formed a coalition government with the Labour Party. Treacy was appointed as Minister of State at the Departments of the Taoiseach, at the Department of Finance and at the Department of Transport, Energy and Communications with responsibility for Energy. This government lost office in December 1994.

Fianna Fáil returned to government in June 1997 under Bertie Ahern as Taoiseach. In October 1997, Treacy was appointed Minister of State at the Department of Enterprise, Trade and Employment and at the Department of Education and Science with responsibility for science and technology, replacing Michael Smith who had been promoted to cabinet following the resignation of Ray Burke. Following the 2002 general election, he was appointed Minister of State at the Department of Agriculture and Food, with responsibility for Food and Horticulture.

He unsuccessfully contested the 1999 European Parliament election in Connacht–Ulster.

In reshuffle in September 2004, Treacy was appointed as Minister of State at the Department of Foreign Affairs and at the Department of the Taoiseach, with special responsibility for European Affairs.

Treacy was returned to Dáil Éireann at the 2007 general election. This was his eighth successive time being elected.

Following 17 years as a Minister of State in various governments, Treacy was not reappointed to a junior ministerial post by then Taoiseach Bertie Ahern. He was subsequently appointed Chairman of Joint Oireachtas Committee on the implementation of the Good Friday Agreement.

He retired from politics at the 2011 general election.

Personal life
Treacy served as the chairman of Galway County GAA Board for five years and, afterwards, served on the Connacht Council. He died on 2 February 2022, at the age of 70.

References

 

1951 births
2022 deaths
Chairmen of county boards of the Gaelic Athletic Association
Connacht Provincial Council administrators
Fianna Fáil TDs
Galway County Board administrators
Local councillors in County Galway
Members of the 23rd Dáil
Members of the 24th Dáil
Members of the 25th Dáil
Members of the 26th Dáil
Members of the 27th Dáil
Members of the 28th Dáil
Members of the 29th Dáil
Members of the 30th Dáil
Ministers of State of the 25th Dáil
Ministers of State of the 26th Dáil
Ministers of State of the 27th Dáil
Ministers of State of the 28th Dáil
Ministers of State of the 29th Dáil
People educated at Garbally College
People from Ballinasloe
Politicians from County Galway